Rallagudem is a village in Rangareddy district in Andhra Pradesh, India. It is close to Shamshabad.

References

Villages in Ranga Reddy district